The World of Glamour was an Australian television series which aired 1964 to 1965 on Sydney station TCN-9. Hosted by Elaine White, and revolved around about fashion and beauty. It seems to have aired in a 27-minute time-slot. It is not known if any of the episodes still exist, given the wiping of the era.

See also
Beauty Case - 1958 series with Elaine White

References

External links
The World of Glamour on IMDb

1964 Australian television series debuts
1965 Australian television series endings
Black-and-white Australian television shows
English-language television shows
Fashion-themed television series